Kree Annette Harrison (born May 17, 1990) is an American singer and musician, who was the runner-up on the twelfth season of American Idol.

Early life
Kree Annette Harrison was born on May 17, 1990 at St. Mary's Hospital in Port Arthur, Texas. The family moved to Woodville, Texas in a home that was given to them by their grandmother. At three, Harrison asked her pastor if she could sing during church. The request was accepted and after she sang, her pastor commented, "I was expecting Jesus Loves Me, but she belted out El Shaddai by Amy Grant. I knew then this child had a special gift." Over the next several years, Harrison sang for churches, rodeos, weddings and competitions. At eight, she was the opening act for R&B performer Percy Sledge. At nine, she won "Artist of the Year" from Kirbyville Playhouse, and at ten, she sang on The Rosie O'Donnell Show and was invited back on three other occasions. She sang in country playhouses all over the area, as a special guest at a Warren Talent Show, and she was second-place winner in the New York Apollo competition held in Houston. On October 11, 2001, Harrison's father died after the plane he was on crashed off the coast of Spain. After sixth grade, her family moved to Nashville to pursue her singing career. She attended seventh grade there, and was home schooled afterwards to devote more time to her music. On September 22, 2009, Harrison's mother was killed in a head-on traffic collision.

Harrison scored a development deal with Lyric Street Records at ten, which resulted in her family moving from Woodville to Nashville. The deal ended two years later without any recordings released due in part to some creative differences.

Harrison began writing her own songs at the age of fourteen and often found herself in writing sessions with songwriters such as Trey Bruce and artist Rebecca Lynn Howard. She performed across local venues in Nashville such as the Bluebird Cafe. Harrison signed a publishing deal with Chrysalis Records at sixteen. She was working on an album when her mother died. She would later meet with an executive travel and event coordinator at Broadcast Music, Inc. (BMI), and made affiliations with the company. She would go on to perform at BMI showcases in Florida, such as the Key West Songwriters Festival and the San Destin Music Festival. She also sang backup vocals on Kacey Musgraves' album, Same Trailer Different Park, and Eli Young Band's album Life at Best.

Harrison was friends with country singer Mindy McCready. McCready invited Harrison up to sing her song "Guys Do It All the Time" with her at a 2011 Country Music Association performance in Nashville.

American Idol

Overview
Harrison auditioned in Oklahoma City and performed an original song that she wrote to her mother.

In the semi-finals, Harrison performed "Cry" by Faith Hill. On March 7, 2013, Harrison was voted into the Top 10. Her performance of "Crying" by Roy Orbison earned her enough votes to establish her as one of the night's top three contestants, along with Candice Glover and Angie Miller. Harrison once again landed in the night's top three contestants after she performed "Piece of My Heart" by Erma Franklin, along with Lazaro Arbos and Angie Miller. After her Top 6 performance, Harrison earned enough votes to land in the night's top two contestants, along with Candice Glover. For the first time, after her Top 5 performance, she landed in the bottom two. She became the runner-up on May 16, 2013.

Performances and results

 When Ryan Seacrest announced the results for this particular night, Harrison was in the bottom 2, but declared safe as Janelle Arthur was eliminated.
 Due to the surprise non-elimination at the top 4, the top 4 remained intact for another week.
 When Ryan Seacrest announced the results for this particular night, Harrison was in the bottom 2, but declared safe as Amber Holcomb was eliminated.

Post-Idol career
Harrison took part in the American Idols LIVE! Tour 2013, from July 19 through August 31, 2013. In July 2013, it was announced that Harrison had not been picked up by the Universal Music Group Nashville. On May 6, 2014, Harrison premiered a new song called "Strong and Silent," which she co-wrote with Fancy Hagood and Kate York.

She performed on the fifteenth season finale of American Idol on April 7, 2016. The second single, "Dead Man's House," was released in May 2016, and her debut album, This Old Thing, was released on July 8, 2016.

Harrison parted ways with Plaid Flag in early 2018, signing a new record deal with One Vision Music Group. Harrison released a new single "I Love the Lie" in March 2019. "Get Away with Anything" was released in October 2019, and Harrison's second studio album, Chosen Family Tree, was announced for a January 2020 release, but it was later pushed back to a release date of June 12, 2020, although it was pushed back again to August 21, 2020.

Discography

Studio albums

Singles

Music videos

References

External links
 Kree Harrison on American Idol
 

1990 births
Living people
American blues guitarists
American blues singer-songwriters
American child singers
American country drummers
American country guitarists
American women country singers
American country singer-songwriters
American women drummers
American women singer-songwriters
American Idol participants
American Protestants
Chrysalis Records artists
Lyric Street Records artists
Musicians from Nashville, Tennessee
Singer-songwriters from Texas
People from Port Arthur, Texas
People from Woodville, Texas
21st-century American women guitarists
21st-century American guitarists
Singer-songwriters from Tennessee
Guitarists from Tennessee
Guitarists from Texas
21st-century American drummers
21st-century American women singers
Country musicians from Texas
Country musicians from Tennessee
21st-century American singers